"Major Star", or "Plan C: Major Star", is the third episode of Blackadder Goes Forth, the fourth series of the BBC sitcom Blackadder. It originally aired on 12 October 1989.

Plot
Blackadder is feeling bored, so George suggests a Charlie Chaplin film to cheer him up, but Blackadder declines, citing his hatred of Chaplin. Baldrick gets a newspaper reporting that the Russian Revolution has started and the Russians have pulled out of the war as a result. George is initially delighted, until Blackadder reminds him that the Russians were their allies, and Blackadder is dismayed, since it will mean "three-quarters of a million Germans leaving the Russian Front and coming over here with the express purpose of using my nipples for target practice!" Blackadder decides to desert but is stopped when General Melchett arrives in the trench as he ironically needs Blackadder to help him shoot some deserters. Melchett, reminding Blackadder of the French army mutinies the previous year, and the recent Russian uprising, is determined to prevent the same thing happening in the British Army. To prevent an uprising, he asks Captain Blackadder to organise a cabaret to boost the men's morale, something that Blackadder eagerly accepts when a possible tour is mentioned (which would allow him to leave the trenches). Melchett also asks his driver, Corporal "Bob" Parkhurst, to aid Blackadder. Blackadder immediately notices that "Bob" is a woman in disguise, something of which Melchett remains entirely unaware; however, Bob persuades Blackadder not to reveal the truth.

The show, which features Baldrick's Charlie Chaplin impression (featuring a dead slug called Graham as Baldrick's "moustache"), which Melchett thinks is a slug-balancing act, and Lieutenant George's drag act, "Gorgeous Georgina", is a success on its first night, but unfortunately Melchett falls in love with "Georgina", takes her to the Regimental Ball, and proposes to her. Worst of all, George accepts because he feared he may have been court-martialled for disobeying a superior officer.

Blackadder is called to Melchett's office, and it is revealed the marriage is to take place that Saturday and that Melchett wants him to be his best man. Consequently, Blackadder informs Melchett that there is something wrong with Georgina. At first Melchett is worried she may be Welsh, but Blackadder then informs him of Georgina's "death" from stepping on a cluster of landmines. At first, Melchett mourns deeply for his "perfect woman", but seconds later, he recovers by saying "Oh well. Can't be helped. Can't be helped". He then refuses to continue the show, citing that Georgina was "the only good thing about it", but Blackadder says he has already found a new leading lady. These words place Blackadder in "the stickiest situation since Sticky the stick insect got stuck on a sticky bun".

George's suggestions as to who to replace him as leading lady are rejected by Blackadder as being "too short", "too old" or "too dead". Baldrick offers to take up the role, but Blackadder quickly dismisses the idea (in truth, Baldrick's plan was to marry Melchett and be a Trojan Horse – or "frozen horse" as he refers to it as – to bring down the aristocracy). He then realises he has had a leading lady in his presence all the time and replaces George with Bob. In spite of Bob's more convincing and better received "drag" act, and Baldrick's now seemingly "feeble impression of Buster Keaton", Melchett proclaims the second night's show a "disaster", recognising Bob and still not realising she is a woman, and immediately stops any possibility of a tour (and Blackadder leaving). He instead declares that with the arrival of the Americans into the war, morale will be boosted by "endless showings of Charlie Chaplin films" (with Blackadder as projectionist at a personal request from Chaplin himself, much to his annoyance). Captain Darling revels in Melchett's displeasure with Blackadder, causing Blackadder to offer him a "liquorice allsort" (Baldrick's slug), which he accepts.

External links
 
 

Blackadder episodes
1989 British television episodes
Television shows written by Ben Elton
Television shows written by Richard Curtis